Chicago City Limits (CCL), is the longest running improvisational theatre company in New York City, New York.

History 
Chicago City Limits is New York City's seminal improvisational theatre company, founded in 1977. George Todisco started the group in Chicago with actors participating in the workshop program at The Second City, studying under Del Close. Among the players were founding members Todisco, Linda Gelman, Bill McLaughlin, Carol Schindler, Paul Zuckerman, Rick Crom and Christopher Oyen. Oyen served as The Second City's stage manager, and Todisco, McLaughlin, Schindler and Sandy Smith (an early member of the troupe), all appeared in "The Del Close Farewell Salute to Chicago" in 1978. In 1979, Chicago City Limits relocated to New York, performing regularly at Catch a Rising Star, the Improv, the Duplex, Folk City and other notable NYC clubs. It established its own theater (now the José Quintero Theatre) in the summer of 1980 on W 42nd Street, thus creating NYC's most successful improvisational theatre to date, and the last improvisational theatre in NYC to offer the New York company salaried positions.) After setting up the theater on 42nd Street (1 year), the troupe relocated to the  Jan Hus Playhouse at 351 E 74th St. (14 years) and, later, at their own theatre, once again, at 1105 1st Avenue (9 years), at The Broadway Comedy Club on E 53rd St. (9 years) and returned to the Jan Hus Playhouse (2 years), before suspending its run in 2016. The group no longer has a performance space, but tours sporadically and occasionally offers workshop opportunities.

CCL was a three-time recipient of The Manhattan Association of Cabarets and Clubs (MAC) Award. The Chicago City Limits National Touring Company received the first MAC Award given for Best Comedy/Improv Group in 1987 and again in 1988. The New York Company won again in 2008. In 2011, Top 10 New York City by Eleanor Berman rated it one of New York City's top 10 comedy clubs.

Resident Company alumni (NYC) (listed chronologically) 
 
 George Todisco (Founding Member) ø
 Linda Gelman (Founding Member) †ø
 Bill McLaughlin (Founding Member)
 Carol Schindler (Founding Member)
 Paul Zuckerman (Founding Member) ø
 Rick Crom (Founding Member/Musical Director))
 Christopher Oyen (Founding Member) ø
 David Regal
 Eddie Ellner (Musical Director)
 Judy Nazemetz
 Terry Sommer
 John Cameron Telfer
 Rick Simpson
 Judith Searcy
 Harry Prichett
 Wayne Barker (Musical Director)
 Wendy Chatman
 Carole Buggé
 Carl Kissin †
 Gary Adler (Musical Director)
 John Webber
 Leslie Upson
 Andy Daly
 Frank Spitznagel (Musical Director)
 Denny Siegel
 Sean Conroy
 John O'Donnell
 Joe DeGise II ƒ
 Victor Varnado
 Joe O'Brien
 Annie Schiffmann
 Rob Schiffmann π
 Tara Copeland
 Mike Leffingwell
 Eugene Cordero
 Morgan Phillips
 Kimmy Gatewood
 Travis Ploeger (Musical Director)
 Canedy Knowles
 Kobi Libii
 Stefan Schick
 Rick Hip-Flores (Musical Director)
 Malachi Nimmons, Jr.
 Julia Young
 Assaf Gleizners (Musical Director)

ƒ- Co-Director
ø- Co-Producer
†- Director of The Chicago City Limits National Touring Company
π- Musical Director (Touring Company)
œ- Accompanist

National Touring Company alumni (listed alphabetically) 
 
 Pete Aguero
 Jessica Allen
 Larry Bell
 Tony Carnevale
 David Chernicoff
 Jeff Clinkenbeard
 Claudia Cogan
 Mike Colasuonno
Jamie Denbo
 Colton Dunn
 Brian Finkelstein
 Jason Fletcher
 Sharon Fogerty
 Adrianne Frost
 Danny Glover
 Alison Grambs
 Wendy Herlich
Suzanne Hevner
 Sharon Jensen
 Lisa Jolley
 Anthony King
 Rachel Korowitz
Meg Sweeney Lawless
Emmy Laybourne
 Annie Lebeau œ
 Beth Littleford
 Megan Loughran
 Simone Lutz
 Jono Manelli œ
 Michael Martin
 Andy McCann
 Robert McCaskill †
 John McMahon π
 Caitlin Miller
 David Miner ø
 Jim Mironchik œ
 Julie Mullen
 Jen Nails
 Doug Nervik π
 Susan Peahl
 Eddie Pepitone
 Joe Perce
 Molly Prather
 Ian Prior
 Mary Purdy
Steve Purnick
 Deb Rabbai
 Amy Rhodes
 Charlie Sanders
 Michael Sansonia π
 Celia Schaefer
 Ben Schecter œ
 Paul Scheer
 Jeff Scherer
Danielle Schnieder
 Rory Scholl
Joe Schwartz
 Ann Scobie
Ges Selmont ø
 Eliza Skinner
 Rich Sommer
 Chris Tallman
 John E. Ten Eyck
 Peter Tolan ¥
 Greg Triggs 
 Nelson Walters
 Amy Wilson

ƒ- Co-Director
ø- Co-Producer
†- Director of The Chicago City Limits National Touring Company
π- Musical Director (Touring Company)
œ- Accompanist
¥- Hired, no performances

Some past revues 
 
Dented
He She It
Chicago City Limits: Population 5
Blizzard of ‘81
Chicago City Limits in Sensible Shoes
Chicago City Limits: Greatest Hits
Chicago City Limits in 3D
Chicago City Limits with Clam Sauce
Chicago City Limits Behind Bars
Nancy Get Your Gun
Choice Cuts
X: The Roman Numeral
Current Jam
Taking Liberties
Taking More Liberties
10 of Inequity
The Best of Chicago City Limits
Everything Kills
Scandals of '89
Saddam You're Rockin' the Boat
Power of Suggestion
The Official Comedy Team of the Olympics
Unconventional Wisdom
Generation Ecch
Let Loose the Dogs of Improv
Two Johns Kissin Leslie
That's What You Said
Right to Laugh Party
chicagocitylimits.comedy
Subpoenas Envy
Lame Duck Soup
Chicago City Limits Turns 20: Now And Forever...And We Mean It.
Y2K You're OK
Chicago City Limits Gets amBUSHed!
Unconventional Humor
Chicago City Limits on Ice
Hus on First

References

Video 
Chicago City Limits Performance Clips. 
Chicago City Limits with Leslie Upson, Andy Daly, John Cameron Telfer, Carl Kissin and Gary Adler
Experimental Interactive TV Project in 1980.
George Todisco speaks to Rick Crom about the origin of Chicago City Limits.

External links
Chicago City Limits homepage
Facebook page
Twitter page
Improv Resource Center
List of Improvisational Theatre Companies

Comedy clubs in the United States
Nightlife in New York City
Improvisational troupes